Kertme can refer to:

 Kertme, Çorum
 Kertme, Göynücek
 Kertme, Sungurlu